The Manitou Limestone is a geologic formation in Colorado. It preserves fossils dating back to the Ordovician period.

Depositional Environment

Because the rocks of the Manitou Dolomites are mostly indeterminate carbonates, the exact depositional environment is unknown. However it was likely shallow water, either lagoon or near-shore, and the many jumbled fossils of trilobite spines and brachiopods suggest that the paleoenvironment may have been prone to storms.

Paleontology

The limestones and dolomites of the Manitou Formation, contain cast/mold-preserved Ordovician-aged marine fossils, including cystoid stems, brachiopods, and trilobites such as Manitouella (Leiostegium?) and Kainella.

See also

 List of fossiliferous stratigraphic units in Colorado
 Paleontology in Colorado

References
 

Ordovician Colorado
Ordovician southern paleotropical deposits